Gabriel Alejandro Milito (born 7 September 1980) is an Argentine former footballer who played as a central defender, currently the manager of Argentinos Juniors.

He spent most of his professional career in Spain, representing Zaragoza and Barcelona. Over seven seasons, he amassed La Liga totals of 187 matches and six goals.

Milito appeared with the Argentina national team in three major tournaments, including the 2006 World Cup, winning 42 caps.

Playing career

Club

Early years
Born in Bernal, Quilmes, Buenos Aires Province, Milito started playing professionally with Primera División side Club Atlético Independiente in 1997. During that time he often faced his older brother Diego, who played for Independiente's arch-rivals Racing Club de Avellaneda.

Zaragoza
In July 2003, Milito was due to be transferred to Real Madrid, but the Spaniards rejected the player after medical results showed, according to them, a not-fully-recovered knee injury; Jorge Valdano, who acted as director of football, further added that the player had always been appreciated for his technical skills, but his physical state was a cause for great concern. He decided to stay in the country, and joined Real Zaragoza.

In his four seasons with the Aragonese, Milito was an automatic first choice (never played fewer than 33 La Liga matches), and rejoined sibling Diego in 2005. On 10 July 2007, an agreement was reached with FC Barcelona for €18.5million (£13.9 million) and, the following week, he passed his medical and signed a four-year deal with the club worth €4 million (£2.7 million) a year; he was given the number 3 shirt, which was formerly worn by Thiago Motta.

Barcelona

Milito made his competitive debut for Barcelona on 2 September 2007, in a 3–1 home win against Athletic Bilbao. He scored his first goal for the Catalans on 24 November, in a 3–0 victory over Recreativo de Huelva also at the Camp Nou.

On 5 May 2008, it was announced that Milito had damage to the anterior cruciate ligament in his right knee. This rendered him ineligible for the entire 2008–09 campaign, which ended in a treble.

After being sidelined for almost two years (602 days), Milito finally returned to action when he played in a friendly with Kazma SC in Kuwait. On 5 January 2010, he made his return to competitive football in the first leg of the Copa del Rey's round of 16, a 1–2 home loss against Sevilla FC. He reappeared in the domestic league five days later, coming on as a substitute for Carles Puyol for the final seven minutes of the 5–0 home defeat of CD Tenerife.

Milito contributed one goal to a 5–1 home win against AD Ceuta in the domestic cup on 11 November 2010 (7–1 on aggregate), but had to leave the game injured. On 30 April 2011, starting in a league match at Real Sociedad, he had a goal wrongfully ruled out for offside with the score at 1–1, as the hosts went on to win it 2–1; as a result of his action he also tore a calf muscle, being sidelined for the rest of the season and making ten appearances for the eventual champions.

Return to Independiente
In early August 2011, the 30-year-old Milito was released from the last year of his contract with Barcelona, and signed shortly after with former club Independiente. On 12 June 2012, he announced his retirement due to being mentally and physically exhausted.

International

Milito participated in the 2005 FIFA Confederations Cup with Argentina, helping the nation to the final. He was also part of the squad which took part in the 2006 FIFA World Cup, performing well in his only appearance, the group stage match against the Netherlands which ended in a 0–0 draw.

Milito was selected to the 2007 Copa América squad. He contributed five appearances, as the Albiceleste finished in second position in Venezuela.

On 20 August 2010, national team coach Sergio Batista recalled Milito for a friendly with Spain the following month, the player's first international appearance in more than three years. He started in the 4–1 win in Buenos Aires, and he was subsequently selected for the 2011 Copa América, appearing in all the games for the eventual quarter-finalists.

Coaching career
Milito's first coaching experience was with the reserves team of Independiente. He resigned late into 2014, due to differences with the club's president Hugo Moyano.

On 15 April 2015, Milito replaced Mauricio Pellegrino at the helm of Estudiantes de La Plata, after being convinced by president Juan Sebastián Verón. Despite good results, he resigned at the end of the year.

On 12 May 2016, Milito was re-appointed as Independiente manager, again in the place of Pellegrino. He signed an 18-month contract.

Milito started his first coaching adventure outside Argentina on 9 August 2017, signing for two years with O'Higgins F.C. from the Chilean Primera División. He returned to Estudiantes on a three-year deal on 11 March 2019 but, one year later, after being ousted in the round of 64 of the Copa Argentina by lowly Deportivo Laferrere, he again resigned. 

In January 2021, Milito signed a three-year contract at Argentinos Juniors, replacing Diego Dabove who had moved to San Lorenzo de Almagro.

Personal life
Milito's older brother, Diego, was also a footballer. A striker, he played with individual and team success for Inter Milan, and they both represented Real Zaragoza and the national team.

Career statistics

Club

International

(Argentina score listed first, score column indicates score after each Milito goal)

Honours
Independiente
Argentine Primera División: Apertura 2002

Zaragoza
Copa del Rey: 2003–04
Supercopa de España: 2004

Barcelona
La Liga: 2009–10, 2010–11
Supercopa de España: 2010
UEFA Champions League: 2010–11
Copa del Rey runner-up: 2010–11

Individual
Argentine Footballer of the Year: 2002
South American Team of the Year: 2002

Managerial statistics

References

External links

1980 births
Living people
Argentine people of Italian descent
Argentine people of Calabrian descent 
Sportspeople from Buenos Aires Province
Argentine footballers
Association football defenders
Argentine Primera División players
Club Atlético Independiente footballers
La Liga players
Real Zaragoza players
FC Barcelona players
UEFA Champions League winning players
Argentina youth international footballers
Argentina under-20 international footballers
Argentina international footballers
2005 FIFA Confederations Cup players
2006 FIFA World Cup players
2007 Copa América players
2011 Copa América players
Argentine expatriate footballers
Expatriate footballers in Spain
Argentine expatriate sportspeople in Spain
Argentine football managers
Argentine Primera División managers
Estudiantes de La Plata managers
Club Atlético Independiente managers
Argentinos Juniors managers
Chilean Primera División managers
O'Higgins F.C. managers
Argentine expatriate football managers
Expatriate football managers in Chile
Argentine expatriate sportspeople in Chile